Marieke Stam (born 21 April 1964) is a retired speed skater from the Netherlands. She competed at the 1988 Winter Olympics in the 1500 m, 3000 m and 5000 m events and finished in 12th, 16th and 13th place, respectively. 

Nationally, she won two titles, in 3000 m in 1989 and allround sprint in 1991, and had at least one medal in some speed skating event every year between 1985 and 1993. She retired in 1994.

Personal bests: 
500 m – 40.78 (1991)
1000 m – 1:21.47 (1989)
 1500 m – 2:05.59 (1989)
 3000 m – 4:23.06 (1987)
 5000 m – 7:34.29 (1987)

References

1964 births
Living people
Olympic speed skaters of the Netherlands
Speed skaters at the 1988 Winter Olympics
Dutch female speed skaters
Sportspeople from Alkmaar
21st-century Dutch women
20th-century Dutch women